Raveen Sayer (born 25 November 1996) is a Sri Lankan cricketer. He made his first-class debut for Colombo Cricket Club in the 2016–17 Premier League Tournament on 20 January 2017. He made his List A debut for Colombo District in the 2016–17 Districts One Day Tournament on 22 March 2017. He made his Twenty20 debut for Galle Cricket Club in the 2017–18 SLC Twenty20 Tournament on 24 February 2018.

References

External links
 

1996 births
Living people
Sri Lankan cricketers
Colombo Cricket Club cricketers
Colombo District cricketers
Galle Cricket Club cricketers
Sri Lanka Navy Sports Club cricketers
Sportspeople from Kandy